Paper Flowers is a 1977 Mexican drama film directed by Gabriel Retes. It was entered into the 28th Berlin International Film Festival.

Cast
 Ana Luisa Peluffo
 Gabriel Retes
 Tina Romero
 Claudio Brook
 Ignacio Retes
 Silvia Mariscal
 Juan Ángel Martínez
 Adriana Roel

References

External links

1977 films
1977 drama films
Mexican drama films
1970s Spanish-language films
Films directed by Gabriel Retes
1970s Mexican films